Judge Boyle may refer to:

Edward James Boyle Sr. (1913–2002), judge of the United States District Court for the Eastern District of Louisiana
Francis J. Boyle (1927–2006), judge of the United States District Court for the District of Rhode Island
Jane J. Boyle (born 1954), judge of the United States District Court for the Northern District of Texas
John Boyle (congressman) (1774–1834), judge of the United States District Court for the District of Kentucky
Patricia Boyle (1937–2014), judge of the United States District Court for the Eastern District of Michigan
Terrence Boyle (born 1945), judge of the United States District Court for the Eastern District of North Carolina